The 2008 NPF Senior Draft is the fifth annual NPF Draft.  It was held February 18, 2008 via conference call for the 2008 season.  The first selection was Arizona State's Katie Burkhart, picked by the Philadelphia Force.  Athletes are not allowed by the NCAA to sign professional contracts until their collegiate seasons have ended.

2008 NPF Draft

Following are the 24 selections from the 2008 NPF Senior Draft:
Position key: 
C = Catcher; UT = Utility infielder; INF = Infielder; 1B = First base; 2B =Second base SS = Shortstop; 3B = Third base; OF = Outfielder; RF = Right field; CF = Center field; LF = Left field;  P = Pitcher; RHP = right-handed Pitcher; LHP = left-handed Pitcher; DP =Designated player
Positions are listed as combined for those who can play multiple positions.

Round 1

Round 2

Round 3

Round 4

References 

2008 in softball
National Pro Fastpitch drafts